This is a list of submissions to the 74th Academy Awards for Best Foreign Language Film. The Academy of Motion Picture Arts and Sciences has invited the film industries of various countries to submit their best film for the Academy Award for Best Foreign Language Film every year since the award was created in 1956. The award is presented annually by the Academy to a feature-length motion picture produced outside the United States that contains primarily non-English dialogue. The Foreign Language Film Award Committee oversees the process and reviews all the submitted films.

For the 74th Academy Awards, which were held on March 24, 2002, the Academy invited 78 countries to submit films for the Academy Award for Best Foreign Language Film. Fifty-one countries submitted films to the Academy, including Armenia  and Tanzania, all of which submitted films for the first time. Uruguay, whose submission for the 65th Academy Awards was disqualified, submitted an eligible film for the first time. The Academy released a list of the five nominees for the award on February 12, 2002. The winner of the Academy Award for Best Foreign Language Film was Bosnia and Herzegovina's No Man's Land, which was directed by Danis Tanović.

Submissions

References
General

Specific

External links
Official website for the 74th Academy Awards

74